Iker Muñoz Cameros (born 5 November 2002) is a Spanish footballer who plays as a midfielder for CA Osasuna.

Club career
Born in Villafranca, Navarre, Muñoz joined CA Osasuna's youth setup in 2018, from CD Oberena. On 9 April of the following year, he renewed his contract until 2021.

Muñoz made his senior debut with the reserves on 30 November 2019, coming on as a late substitute for goalscorer Aimar Oroz in a 3–1 Segunda División B home win over Deportivo Alavés B. Definitely promoted to the B-side ahead of the 2021–22 season, he scored his first goal on 16 October 2021, netting the B's second in a 2–2 home draw against Racing Rioja CF.

On 30 December 2022, Muñoz further extended his link until 2025. He made his first team – and La Liga – debut the following 12 February, replacing Lucas Torró in a 0–0 away draw against Real Valladolid.

References

External links

2002 births
Living people
Spanish footballers
Footballers from Navarre
Association football midfielders
La Liga players
Primera Federación players
Segunda División B players
Segunda Federación players
CA Osasuna B players
CA Osasuna players